D'Silva is a surname. Notable people with the surname include:

Carl d'Silva (died 2015), Indian wildlife artist and naturalist.
Amancio D'Silva (1936–1996), Indian jazz guitarist and composer.
Dale Martin D'Silva, Alberta Liberal Party candidate in 2008.
Darrell D'Silva (born 1964), British film and theatre actor.
John D'Silva, Indian Konkani actor and stage actor.
Rensil D'Silva, Indian film director, screenplay writer, Creative Director.
Robert D'Silva (1925–2015), Pakistani Roman Catholic priest.
Selma D'Silva (born 1960), former player for the Indian Women's Hockey Team.
Shilton D'Silva (born 1992), Indian professional footballer.
Ryan D’Silva (born 1982),
Actor, Film industry, Singer.

See also
Silva